Owlaghan (also Romanized as Owlāghān and Ūlāghān) is a village in Vilkij-e Shomali Rural District, in the Central District of Namin County, Ardabil Province, Iran. At the 2006 census, its population was 114, in 23 families.

References 

Towns and villages in Namin County